Baboye or Baboy is a village and seat of the commune of Pignari in the Cercle of Bandiagara in the Mopti Region of southern-central Mali.

The village is located at the base of a hill. The local language is Ampari Dogon. Local surnames are Degoga, Karambe, and Bira-Ogon.

References

Populated places in Mopti Region